The 1969 Ole Miss Rebels baseball team represented the University of Mississippi in the 1969 NCAA University Division baseball season. The Rebels played their home games at Swayze Field. The team was coached by Tom Swayze in his 19th year as head coach at Ole Miss.

The Rebels won the District III to advance to the College World Series, where they were defeated by the Texas Longhorns.

Roster

Schedule

! style="" | Regular Season
|- valign="top" 

|- bgcolor="#ffcccc"
| 1 || March 17 ||  || Swayze Field • Oxford, Mississippi || 2–6 || 0–1 || –
|- bgcolor="#ccffcc"
| 2 || March 21 ||  || Swayze Field • Oxford, Mississippi || 7–1 || 1–1 || –
|- bgcolor="#ccffcc"
| 3 || March 22 || Southern Mississippi || Swayze Field • Oxford, Mississippi || 4–3 || 2–1 || –
|- bgcolor="#ffcccc"
| 4 || March 24 ||  || Swayze Field • Oxford, Mississippi || 0–1 || 2–2 || –
|- bgcolor="#ccffcc"
| 5 || March 24 || Kansas State || Swayze Field • Oxford, Mississippi || 9–3 || 3–2 || –
|- bgcolor="#ffcccc"
| 6 || March 25 || Kansas State || Swayze Field • Oxford, Mississippi || 4–11 || 3–3 || –
|- bgcolor="#ccffcc"
| 7 || March 25 || Kansas State || Swayze Field • Oxford, Mississippi || 10–0 || 4–3 || –
|- bgcolor="#ccffcc"
| 8 || March 26 ||  || Swayze Field • Oxford, Mississippi || 8–5 || 5–3 || –
|- bgcolor="#ffcccc"
| 9 || March 31 || vs  || Unknown • Riverside, California || 11–13 || 5–4 || –
|-

|-
! style="" | Postseason
|- valign="top" 

|- bgcolor="#ffcccc"
| 10 || April 1 || vs  || Unknown • Riverside, California || 5–8 || 5–5 || –
|- bgcolor="#ffcccc"
| 11 || April 2 || vs  || Unknown • Riverside, California || 6–7 || 5–6 || –
|- bgcolor="#ffcccc"
| 12 || April 2 || vs  || Unknown • Riverside, California || 0–5 || 5–7 || –
|- bgcolor="#ccffcc"
| 13 || April 4 || at  || Unknown • Riverside, California || 13–7 || 6–7 || –
|- bgcolor="#ffcccc"
| 14 || April 4 || vs UCLA || Unknown • Riverside, California || 2–5 || 6–8 || –
|- bgcolor="#ccffcc"
| 15 || April 5 || vs  || Unknown • Riverside, California || 5–3 || 7–8 || –
|- bgcolor="#ccffcc"
| 16 || April 7 ||  || Swayze Field • Oxford, Mississippi || 4–0 || 8–8 || 1–0
|- bgcolor="#ccffcc"
| 17 || April 7 || Mississippi State || Swayze Field • Oxford, Mississippi || 2–1 || 9–8 || 2–0
|- bgcolor="#ccffcc"
| 18 || April 8 || Mississippi State || Swayze Field • Oxford, Mississippi || 4–3 || 10–8 || 3–0
|- bgcolor="#ccffcc"
| 19 || April 11 || at  || Alex Box Stadium • Baton Rouge, Louisiana || 7–3 || 11–8 || 4–0
|- bgcolor="#ccffcc"
| 20 || April 11 || at LSU || Alex Box Stadium • Baton Rouge, Louisiana || 4–1 || 12–8 || 5–0
|- bgcolor="#ccffcc"
| 21 || April 15 ||  ||  Swayze Field • Oxford, Mississippi || 8–3 || 13–8 || 5–0
|- bgcolor="#ccffcc"
| 22 || April 16 || Arkansas State ||  Swayze Field • Oxford, Mississippi || 5–4 || 14–8 || 5–0
|- bgcolor="#ffcccc"
| 23 || April 18 || Alabama || Swayze Field • Starkville, Mississippi || 1–4 || 14–9 || 5–1
|- bgcolor="#ccffcc"
| 24 || April 18 || Alabama || Swayze Field • Oxford, Mississippi || 12–1 || 15–9 || 6–1
|- bgcolor="#ccffcc"
| 25 || April 25 || LSU ||  Swayze Field • Oxford, Mississippi || 2–0 || 16–9 || 7–1
|- bgcolor="#ffcccc"
| 26 || April 25 || LSU || Swayze Field • Oxford, Mississippi || 2–3 || 16–10 || 7–2
|- bgcolor="#ccffcc"
| 27 || April 26 || LSU || Swayze Field • Oxford, Mississippi || 6–4 || 17–10 || 8–2
|- bgcolor="#ccffcc"
| 28 || April 29 ||  || Swayze Field • Oxford, Mississippi || 11–1 || 18–10 || 8–2
|-

|- bgcolor="#ccffcc"
| 29 || May 2 || at Alabama || Sewell–Thomas Stadium • Tuscaloosa, Alabama || 2–1 || 19–10 || 9–2
|- bgcolor="#ccffcc"
| 30 || May 2 || at Alabama || Sewell–Thomas Stadium • Tuscaloosa, Alabama || 8–0 || 20–10 || 10–2
|- bgcolor="#ccffcc"
| 31 || May 3 || at Alabama || Sewell–Thomas Stadium • Tuscaloosa, Alabama || 3–2 || 21–10 || 11–2
|- bgcolor="#ffcccc"
| 32 || May 9 || at Mississippi State || Dudy Noble Field • Starkville, Mississippi || 0–2 || 21–11 || 11–3
|- bgcolor="#ffcccc"
| 33 || May 9 || at Mississippi State || Dudy Noble Field • Starkville, Mississippi || 5–11 || 21–12 || 11–4
|- bgcolor="#ffcccc"
| 34 || May 10 || at Mississippi State || Dudy Noble Field • Starkville, Mississippi || 3–10 || 21–13 || 11–5
|-

|-
! style="" | Postseason
|- valign="top" 

|- bgcolor="#ccffcc"
| 35 || May 14 ||  || Sawyze Field • Oxford, Mississippi || 8–2 || 22–13 || 11–5
|- bgcolor="#ccffcc"
| 36 || May 16 || at Florida || Perry Field • Gainesville, Florida || 4–1 || 23–13 || 11–5
|-

|- bgcolor="#ccffcc"
| 37 || May 29 || vs  || Sims Legion Park • Gastonia, North Carolina || 7–6 || 24–13 || 11–5
|- bgcolor="#ccffcc"
| 38 || May 30 || vs  || Sims Legion Park • Gastonia, North Carolina || 6–5 || 25–13 || 11–5
|- bgcolor="#ccffcc"
| 39 || May 31 || vs North Carolina || Sims Legion Park • Gastonia, North Carolina || 5–2 || 26–13 || 11–5
|-

|- bgcolor="#ffcccc"
| 40 || June 14 || vs NYU || Johnny Rosenblatt Stadium • Omaha, Nebraska || 3–8 || 26–14 || 11–5
|- bgcolor="#ccffcc"
| 41 || June 15 || vs  || Johnny Rosenblatt Stadium • Omaha, Nebraska || 8–1 || 27–14 || 11–5
|- bgcolor="#ffcccc"
| 42 || June 16 || vs Texas || Johnny Rosenblatt Stadium • Omaha, Nebraska || 1–14 || 27–15 || 11–5
|-

Awards and honors 
Whitey Adams
All-SEC
All-SEC Western Division

Ed McLarty
All-SEC
All-SEC Western Division

Fred Setser
All-SEC
All-SEC Western Division

John Shaw
All-SEC
All-SEC Western Division

References

Ole Miss Rebels baseball seasons
Ole Miss Rebels baseball
College World Series seasons
Ole Miss
Southeastern Conference baseball champion seasons